Jeff Spock is an American video game writer as well as author of science fiction and fantasy. A graduate of the Clarion West Writers Workshop as well as INSEAD and Brown University, he has lived and worked in the U.S., Japan, and now France.  Spock is an active member of the IGDA Game Writing Special Interest Group, and is involved in numerous creative writing workshops.

Spock is currently working as the Narrative Director and Lead Writer for an independent studio, Amplitude Studios, of which he is a member of the board of directors. Amplitude is based in Paris and released its first game, Endless Space, in July 2012.

Windows games
 Heroes of Might and Magic V
 Heroes of Might and Magic V: Hammers of Fate
 Heroes of Might and Magic V: Tribes of the East
 Tom Clancy's Ghost Recon Advanced Warfighter and Tom Clancy's Ghost Recon Advanced Warfighter 2 - PC versions
 Dark Messiah of Might and Magic
 Dark Messiah of Might and Magic: Elements
 R.U.S.E.
 Might and Magic Heroes Kingdoms online strategy game
 Endless Space 4X strategy game
 Endless Space: Disharmony expansion pack
 Endless Legend 4X turn based - strategy game
 Endless Legend - Guardians Expansion 4X turn based - strategy game

Non-Windows games
 Clash of Heroes
 My Horse & Me 2 (Wii, PlayStation 2, Xbox)
 The Horsez series

Published fiction
 "Soeurs de Sang", Might & Magic Tome 1, Deux Royaumes, 2012.
 "teh afterl1fe," Visions 2020, Rick Novy ed., M-Brane Press
 "Of Love and Mermaids, Tumbarumba.org
 "Everything That Matters," Interzone (magazine), reprinted in Escape Pod (podcast) 228.
 "Fender's Bender," Three Legged Fox Books

References

External links
 IGDA Game Writing Special Interest Group official website

 Amplitude Studios official website

American science fiction writers
American short story writers
American male novelists
American male short story writers